Ianalumab (INN; development code VAY736) is a monoclonal antibody that is being investigated for autoimmune hepatitis, multiple sclerosis, pemphigus vulgaris, rheumatoid arthritis, Sjögren syndrome, and systemic lupus erythematosus.

This drug is being developed by Novartis. , ianalumab is undergoing Phase II/III trials.

References 

Monoclonal antibodies